Lake is an unincorporated community in Tulsa County, Oklahoma, United States. It is located at latitude 36°8'24" North, longitude 96°4'54" West. Lake is made up of two blocks of residential areas and one small store and has a population of approximately 50.

Unincorporated communities in Tulsa County, Oklahoma
Unincorporated communities in Oklahoma